Matthew Middlewood Kirkbride (13 August 1848 – 4 November 1906) was an independent conservative Member of Parliament in New Zealand.

Biography

Born in Ulleskelf in Yorkshire, Kirkbride arrived in New Zealand in July 1863.

He was a friend and neighbour of William Massey, with whom he shared positions on local government.

He won the  against Liberal Ralph Duncan Stewart. He held the Manukau electorate until he died in 1906. His death caused the 6 December  in Manukau, which was won by Frederic Lang.

Notes

References

1848 births
1906 deaths
Members of the New Zealand House of Representatives
New Zealand MPs for Auckland electorates
People from Selby District
English emigrants to New Zealand
19th-century New Zealand politicians